First Congregational Church of New Village is a historic church on the north side of Middle Country Road, west of Elliot Avenue in Lake Grove, New York, United States.

The building was likely constructed in 1818, with some sources saying with the original intent of being of a union meeting house.

The congregation was formed in 1815, with the original title "Third Congregational Church of Brookhaven", and its first pastor was Jacob Corwin.  On March 5, 1845, the church was incorporated as the "First Congregational Church of New Village."

In 1949 the church withdrew from the Congregational denomination, and it became an independent evangelical church; self-governed by its Board of Elders and Deacons.  The congregation of the church moved to a new and larger facility in 1961, and the property was taken over by the Town of Brookhaven around 1970.  It was added to the National Register of Historic Places in 2002.

Today the church is known as New Village Church, and is located a block from the old church building at 3 Wildwood Street, Lake Grove, NY.

The church is depicted on the Lake Grove village seal.  "New Village", however, is the former name of the hamlet of Centereach, whose boundary now lies a few blocks east of the church's location.

References

External links

First Congregational Church of New Village, Lake Grove (Bygone, Long Island)

United Church of Christ churches in New York (state)
Churches on the National Register of Historic Places in New York (state)
Federal architecture in New York (state)
Churches completed in 1818
19th-century United Church of Christ church buildings
Churches in Suffolk County, New York
Cemeteries in Suffolk County, New York
National Register of Historic Places in Suffolk County, New York